Oleg Murayenko (1973 – 2002) was a Kazakhstani serial killer responsible for the murders of six women in Petropavl between March and November 2000, after being erroneously released from prison for killing an inmate in 1998. Following a lengthy investigation and his capture with the use of fingerprints, he was convicted, sentenced to death and executed in 2002.

Biography
Little is known about Murayenko's background. Born in 1973 in Petropavl, he was popular with girls and women from the town, whom described him as a tall and handsome man, akin to a Kazakh Alain Delon. Despite this, Murayenko was first prosecuted at the age of 17, and by the time he reached 25, he had amassed three convictions for robbery and theft. While serving his latest sentence at a prison colony in Novoukrainka, Aiyrtau District, he joined a prison gang called the "Council of Law and Order". On the night of November 19th to 20th, 1998, Murayenko, together with several other members, attacked a group of inmates who had refused to join their gang, beating to death one of them and leaving the other three with fractured ribs, tibias and damaged internal organs. A criminal investigation was initiated into the incident, but due to poor management and hardly any cooperation with the prosecutor's office, the case lasted for two years without indicting anybody. In the meantime, on May 20, 1999, Murayenko had already been released from prison and returned to Petropavl, where not long after he would begin a murder spree.

On March 13, 2000, at about 2 AM, Murayenko came across a woman returning home after going to the "Master and Margarita" café with some friends. He started strangling her with her own scarf and when he ceased, she fell to the ground, he then put his foot on her neck to ensure that she was dead. After killing her, Murayenko stole her sheepskin coat, tearing off a small strap from it in his haste. Despite this, the officers investigating the crime scene were unable to recover any usable evidence that would indicate who the criminal was, apart from a small partial fingerprint left on the woman's handbag. A month later, in another part of town, another murder occurred: after failing to contact her relatives after returning home drunk from a party, the body of the second victim was found in her bed, evidently strangled with a leather coat strap. Like with the first victim, her coat had been stolen, and again, since there were no witnesses or physical evidence, investigators were at a lost as to what exactly had transpired on the night of the murder. In his last confession, Murayenko claimed to have met the woman near a dispensary and offered to accompany her home. In her drunken state, she agreed to have him over for some tea.

In the summer months, Murayenko struck again, strangling a prostitute near her home. For this crime, the taxi driver who had dropped her off was briefly considered a suspect, but later on provided a credible alibi. Again in the summer, in a dacha outside Petropavl, yet another prostitute was killed, this time with either a knife or axe. According to eyewitness reports, the woman had been seen drinking at various kiosks the night before her death, but none had seen her being accompanied or followed by anybody. By this time, rumors of a maniac attacking women began to spread around the city, causing concern for the local authorities, who by then were still unsure if this was the work of a serial offender or not.

In November, in Petropavl's Cheryomushki micro-district, Murayenko entered a local grocery store, locking the door behind him. After doing so, he jumped over the counter and strangled the cashier. After committing the heinous deed, he sat inside for some time, drinking cognac and eating candy. The day after, in the city center, he broke into another store opposite the police station and killed the cashier, who was about to go do some chores. Both incidents occurred in short intervals, but just enough so Murayenko could slip by unnoticed.

Arrest, trial and execution
Not long after the store murders, a retired police officer, Talgat Tugunbayev, was out walking on the streets when he noticed two intoxicated women and a man entering a local hostel. Acting on instinct, he notified the current head of the police department, Nurgali Urazalinov, asking him to send a squadron to check them just in case. The detectives eventually found the trio having sex in one of the rooms, when one of the operatives noticed that one of the girls was wearing the exact same sheepskin coat as one of the murder victims. The trio were taken to the police department, where the girl explained that the coat was given to her by a friend - Oleg Murayenko.

After learning of this, Murayenko was quickly arrested and sent for interrogation. During the process, he gave conflicting accounts on how he came to be in possession of the fur coat, first claiming it was from his nephew and then from his uncle, who had allegedly received it, along with some silverware, from a relative of the deceased woman. In the meantime, Igor Semyonov and Olga Potorocha, heads of the forensic department, compared the partial fingerprint found on the first victim's handbag, and discovered that it was an exact match to those of Murayenko. They forwarded the information to the operatives, whom in turn told Oleg. After he was confronted with this information, he finally admitted to the crimes, explaining in detail how he killed them and where. Despite this, when he was brought to trial, he recanted his confession, admitting responsibility solely for the second murder. Prosecutors were able to accurately present their evidence, however, and after a long trial, Murayenko was found guilty and sentenced to death. In 2002, he was executed, only a year before the moratorium on the death penalty would be introduced in the country, becoming the last known prisoner executed in the North Kazakhstan region.

See also
 List of serial killers by country

References

1973 births
2002 deaths
21st-century criminals
Executed Kazakhstani people
Executed serial killers
Kazakhstani people convicted of murder
Kazakhstani people of Ukrainian descent
Kazakhstani serial killers
Male serial killers
People convicted of murder by Kazakhstan
People convicted of robbery
People convicted of theft
People executed by Kazakhstan
People from Petropavl
Violence against women in Kazakhstan